Orient is a city in Orient Township, Adair County, Iowa, United States. The population was 368 at the time of the 2020 census.

History
Orient was incorporated on March 21, 1882, on land set aside by the nearby Chicago, Burlington and Quincy Railroad.

Geography
Orient is located at  (41.202702, -94.418794).

Demographics

2010 census
As of the census of 2010, there were 408 people, 169 households, and 118 families living in the city. The racial makeup of the city was 98.0% White, 0.2% Native American, 0.2% from other races, and 1.5% from two or more races. Hispanic or Latino of any race were 2.2% of the population.

There were 169 households, of which 32.0% had children under the age of 18 living with them, 58.6% were married couples living together, 8.3% had a female householder with no husband present, 3.0% had a male householder with no wife present, and 30.2% were non-families. 27.2% of all households were made up of individuals, and 14.8% had someone living alone who was 65 years of age or older. The average household size was 2.41 and the average family size was 2.92.

The median age in the city was 40 years. 22.1% of residents were under the age of 18; 7.8% were between the ages of 18 and 24; 25.7% were from 25 to 44; 29% were from 45 to 64; and 15.4% were 65 years of age or older. The gender makeup of the city was 49.8% male and 50.2% female.

2000 census
As of the census of 2000, there were 402 people, 167 households, and 111 families living in the city. The racial makeup of the city was 98.51% White, 0.25% Native American, and 1.24% from two or more races. Hispanic or Latino of any race were 1.24% of the population.

There were 167 households, out of which 32.3% had children under the age of 18 living with them, 55.1% were married couples living together, 7.8% had a female householder with no husband present, and 33.5% were non-families. 28.7% of all households were made up of individuals, and 19.2% had someone living alone who was 65 years of age or older. The average household size was 2.41 and the average family size was 3.02.

Age spread: 25.6% under the age of 18, 7.7% from 18 to 24, 26.9% from 25 to 44, 20.9% from 45 to 64, and 18.9% who were 65 years of age or older. The median age was 39 years. For every 100 females, there were 103.0 males. For every 100 females age 18 and over, there were 100.7 males.

The median income for a household in the city was $35,750, and the median income for a family was $39,219. Males had a median income of $28,438 versus $21,477 for females. The per capita income for the city was $13,937. About 3.2% of families and 6.5% of the population were below the poverty line, including 5.6% of those under age 18 and 17.3% of those age 65 or over.

Education
Orient-Macksburg Community School District operates area public schools.

Notable people

Henry A. Wallace
U.S. Vice President Henry A. Wallace (1941–45) was born on a farm near Orient in 1888. The original farmstead is now home to the Henry A. Wallace Country Life Center, a popular tour site. Wallace founded seed corn company Pioneer Hi-Bred in 1926 and was an editor of Wallace's Farmer magazine. President Franklin D. Roosevelt appointed Wallace to be US Secretary of Agriculture (1933–41) at the depth of the Great Depression. He also served as US Secretary of Commerce (1945-46); and later ran unsuccessfully for President on the Progressive Party ticket in 1948. Wallace was a key figure in assisting Roosevelt to formulate “New Deal” economic recovery policies and in helping the US prepare to join the Allies in defeating Japan and Germany in World War II. He was named the “Most Influential Iowan of the 20th Century” in 1999 by the Des Moines Register.

Steve McClain
Assistant basketball coach for the Georgia Bulldogs men's basketball team.

Dazzy Vance
National Baseball Hall of Fame pitcher Dazzy Vance was born in Orient in 1891.  Vance played professional baseball for twenty years, from his debut game in 1915 until his final game in 1935.  Known for his blazing fastball, Vance is still the only pitcher in history to top the National League in strikeouts seven consecutive seasons.  He earned the Triple Crown of pitching in 1924 and was also named Most Valuable Player that same year.  Vance was inducted into the National Baseball Hall of Fame in 1955.

References

External links

  
Official City Website
Orient-Macksburg Community School District Website
City-Data Comprehensive Statistical Data and more about Orient

Cities in Adair County, Iowa
Cities in Iowa
1879 establishments in Iowa
Populated places established in 1879